The R178 road is a regional road in Ireland. It runs from Dundalk, County Louth via Carrickmacross, County Monaghan and Shercock to Virginia, County Cavan.

See also
Roads in Ireland
National primary road
National secondary road

References
Roads Act 1993 (Classification of Regional Roads) Order 2006 – Department of Transport

Regional roads in the Republic of Ireland
Roads in County Louth
Roads in County Monaghan
Roads in County Cavan